Chelan Falls is a census-designated place and unincorporated community in Chelan County, Washington, United States. The population was 340 at the 2020 census. Chelan Falls has a post office with ZIP code 98817.

References

Census-designated places in Chelan County, Washington
Census-designated places in Washington (state)
Unincorporated communities in Washington (state)
Unincorporated communities in Chelan County, Washington
Washington (state) populated places on the Columbia River